Simone Anzani  (born 24 February 1992) is an Italian volleyball player, a member of the Italy men's national volleyball team and Italian club Sir Safety Perugia, silver medalist of the 2015 World Cup, bronze medalist of the 2015 European Championship and the 2014 World League.

He was a member of Italy team to win 2022 FIVB Volleyball Men's World Championship.

Sporting achievements

Clubs
 FIVB Club World Championship
  Brazil 2019 – with Cucine Lube Civitanova
  Brazil 2021 – with Cucine Lube Civitanova

External links
 LegaVolley player profile

1992 births
Living people
Italian men's volleyball players
Mediterranean Games gold medalists for Italy
Mediterranean Games medalists in volleyball
Competitors at the 2013 Mediterranean Games
Volleyball players at the 2020 Summer Olympics
Olympic volleyball players of Italy
Middle blockers